Huntington-Whiteley is a surname. Notable people with the surname include:
Herbert Huntington-Whiteley (1857–1936), British Conservative politician
Rosie Huntington-Whiteley (born 1987), British model, actress, fashion designer, and businesswoman

See also
Huntington-Whiteley baronets
Huntington (name)
Whiteley (surname)

Compound surnames
English-language surnames
Surnames of English origin